St Thomas' Church is in Caunce Street, Blackpool, Lancashire, England.  It is an active Anglican parish church in the Deanery of Blackpool, the Archdeaconry of Lancaster and the Diocese of Blackburn.

History
The church was built in 1930–32 and designed by the Lancaster architect Henry Paley of Austin and Paley, and cost £10,326 (equivalent to £ in ).  It is constructed in brick with stone dressings, and has windows with mixed Decorated and Perpendicular tracery.  Only the east end of the church and 3½ bays of the nave and aisles were completed.  Brandwood and his co-authors consider that the interior is "of dignity and with several inventive touches".  Because it was never completed, Hartwell and Pevsner in the Buildings of England series describe it as "a stump of a church".

Present day
It continues to be an active church in the Evangelical tradition.

The vicar is the Revd David O’Brien.

See also

List of ecclesiastical works by Austin and Paley (1916–44)

References

Bibliography

External links
 St Thomas' Church website
 St Thomas's, Blackpool at genuki.org

Church of England church buildings in Lancashire
Diocese of Blackburn
Austin and Paley buildings
Gothic Revival church buildings in England
Gothic Revival architecture in Lancashire
20th-century Church of England church buildings
Churches in Blackpool